Stade Arsène Wenger (French: Arsène Wenger Stadium), also erroneously called Stade de Arsène Wenger in international usage, is an association football stadium in Duppigheim, Alsace, France. It was built in 2016 and it is the home ground of USL Duppigheim with a capacity of 500 seats. It is named after the former manager of the Premier League team  Arsenal, Arsène Wenger who grew up in nearby Duttlenheim.

History
USL Duppigheim initially played their home at Rue de Stade in Duppigheim, though Stade Arsène Wenger was built to replace it. The location that Stade Arsène Wenger built upon used to be a farmer's field mostly used for growing potatoes. In 2016, a new 500-seat stadium was built on the site of this field at a cost of €750,000 (£580,000). To commemorate his contribution to football, it was named after Arsenal manager Arsène Wenger. Duppigheim residents jokingly stated "who will tell the guys in Duttlenheim?" upon the news that the stadium named after Wenger would be in Duppigheim.

The stadium was opened by Wenger in May 2016 in front of 600 people. During the ceremony, he stated that he recalled: "When I was little, this stadium was a field of potatoes. Now it looks like Wembley." Wenger also stated that "It’s an honour. I am a little surprised."  The USL Duppigheim chairman Peter Troesch stated that it was an "easy choice" and proclaimed that "He [Wenger] deserves to have one in every village in Alsace and France."

References 

Football venues in France
Sports venues in Bas-Rhin
Sports venues completed in 2016
21st-century architecture in France